Bosnić is a Serbo-Croatian surname, derived from the toponym Bosna (Bosnia). It is irreligious, borne by ethnic Bosniaks (Muslims), Croats (Catholics) and Serbs (Orthodox). It may refer to:

Bilal Bosnić (born 1972), Bosnian Islamist
Vedran Bosnić (born 1976), Bosnian basketball player
Milka Bosnić, Yugoslav Partisan, youngest recipient of the Order of the People's Hero, only 15 when killed during the war
Jelena Bosnić, Serbian writer
Davorka Bosnić, Serbian musician, member of Odjila
Dragan Bosnić, Serbian journalist and photographer
Želimir Bosnić, Croatian politician, former prefect of Dubrovnik-Neretva

See also
Bosnich

Bosnian surnames
Croatian surnames
Serbian surnames